Club Deportivo Corporación Arturo Fernández Vial Femenino is a football club in Chile, from the Concepción area, in the Bio-Bio Region. It represents Fernandez Vial in Chile Women's Championship.

Uniform 

 Home Uniform: Yellow Jersey with vertical black stripes, black shorts, black socks.
 Away Uniform: Black Jersey, black shorts, black socks.

Stadium 
Estadio Municipal de Concepción Alcaldesa Ester Roa, located in Concepción, Chile.

Current squad 
As of Apr 2022

References

External links 

 Official website 

Fernandez Vial
Fernandez Vial
Sport in Biobío Region
1903 establishments in Chile
Concepción, Chile
Women's football clubs in Chile